The 1933 Princeton Tigers football team was an American football team that represented Princeton University as an independent during the 1933 college football season. In their second season under head coach Fritz Crisler, the Tigers compiled a perfect 9–0 record, shut out seven of nine opponents, and outscored all opponents by a total of 217 to 8. 

There was no contemporaneous system in 1933 for determining a national champion. However, Princeton was retroactively named as the national champion by Parke H. Davis. The 1933 Michigan Wolverines football team was selected as national champion by 10 other selectors and as co-champion by Davis.

Tackle Charles Ceppi was selected as a first-team All-American by the All-American Board, the Football Writers Association of America, the International News Service, Liberty magazine, the North American Newspaper Alliance, the Central Press Association, Davis J. Walsh, and the Walter Camp Football Foundation. He was named to the second team by the Associated Press and United Press.

Other key players included halfback Garrett LeVan, end Ken Fairman, quarterback Jack Kadlic, back Homer Spofford, and guard Frank John.

Schedule

References

Princeton
Princeton Tigers football seasons
College football national champions
College football undefeated seasons
Princeton Tigers football